Du mich auch is a 1986 West German film directed by ,  and Dani Levy. The film score was composed by Niki Reiser on his debut.

References

External links 

1986 films
1986 comedy films
German comedy films
West German films
1980s German-language films
Films directed by Dani Levy
Films set in Berlin
German black-and-white films
1986 directorial debut films
1980s German films